is a Japanese dancer and DJ. He is one of the performers of the Japanese group The Rampage from Exile Tribe.

Life and career 
Urakawa started dancing at the age of two.

In the first grade of primary school he started street dancing and became famous in his city.

In the same grade, he formed a trio dance unit with his friends called  and they won numbers of competitions.

His activity gained a reputation and was introduced on the local NBC channel and NBC Radio's official blog as Expected Star of Nagasaki.

Urakawa has won the national championship at the "First National Championship of street dancing among primary schools" in "Super Chample" on Chūkyō TV.

He became interested in DJ-activity before Elementary school, and in the first grade of it he performed as a DJ at the dance competition "All Japan Super Kids", where Rather Unique (which was once formed by Exile's Makidai, Usa and Akira) performed, he has also developed his skills as a DJ and is showing off at events and live performances, his DJ name is "DJ Sho-hey".

In 2008, along with other artists he participated in the “Minna no Uta” program on NHK as part of the Crystal's Chrystal Children, a subgroup of “Crystal Winds” dancers.

In the same year, he co-starred with TRF's SAM on the MV of Hong Kong's popular singer Juno Mak "Wāi".

Urakawa attended EXPG (Exile Professional Gym) of Fukuoka as a scholarship student.

He appeared in various music videos such as: "Someday (Children's Version)" by Exile in 2009 and 24karats Stay Gold (kids & girls ver.).

From 2009 to 2010 he participated in Exile’s tours as a back-up dancer.

From 2011 to 2013, Urakawa was active as a support member of Generations.

In March 2014, he participated in Exile Performer Battle Audition and made it to the finals but was’t selected to join Exile.

In April of the same year, he was announced as a candidate member of The Rampage, and in September he became an official member.

In January 2019, he was appointed as the tourism ambassador of Nagasaki City.

Works

Singles

Filmography

TV Shows

Music videos

Other

References

External links 

 The Rampage Official Website

1997 births
Japanese male dancers
LDH (company) artists
Living people
People from Nagasaki Prefecture
People from Fukuoka Prefecture